Moustapha Sall (born 31 May 1967 in Nouakchott) is the head coach of the Mauritania national football team.  He succeeded Noel Tosi in 2004 and had an immediate impact, leading the team to their biggest ever win, an 8-2 triumph over Somalia.

Sall oversaw the opening of a new training centre and artificial pitch in the Mauritanian capital Nouakchott, with assistance from the FIFA Goal programme and stated that his main aim was to lead the country's national team into the top 100 in the FIFA rankings.

References

Notes
Mauritania on the move 

1967 births
Living people
Mauritanian footballers
Mauritanian football managers
Mauritania national football team managers
People from Nouakchott

Association footballers not categorized by position